is one of the traditional forty throws of Judo as developed by Jigoro Kano. It belongs to the fourth group, Yonkyo, of the traditional throwing list, Gokyo (no waza), of Kodokan Judo. It is also part of the current 67 Throws of Kodokan Judo. Because tori takes a side fall next to uke, the technique is categorized as a side sacrifice technique, Yoku-sutemi. Danzan Ryu's  is also one of the twenty throws in the Nagete list, which most closely resembles Soto Makikomi.

Technique Description 
Graphic
from http://www.judoinfo.com/techdraw.htm

Judo:

Danzan Ryu:

Exemplar Videos:

Demonstrated,
from http://www.suginoharyu.com/html/index.html

Tournament
from http://www.judo.waw.pl/filmiki.html

Similar Techniques, Variants, and Aliases 

English Aliases:
Outer wraparound
Dropping spinning throw

Included Systems 

Judo
Danzan Ryu

Technique History

External links
Judo Techniques by type.
Judo Lists by rank.
Danzan Ryu Lists

References

Judo technique
Throw (grappling)